Aochi (written: 青地) is a Japanese surname. Notable people with the surname include:

, Japanese middle-distance runner
, Japanese ski jumper
, Japanese samurai

Japanese-language surnames